This is a compilation of the properties of different analog materials used to simulate deformational processes in structural geology. Such experiments are often called analog or analogue models. The organization of this page follows the review of rock analog materials in structural geology and tectonics of Reber et al. 2020.

Materials used to simulate upper crustal deformation 

These materials need to exhibit brittle deformation upon failure as well as elastic and viscous deformation before failure.

Materials that simulate upper crustal deformation

Dry granular materials

Materials used to simulate deformation of the lower crust and mantle 

Various fluids are used to simulate deformation of the lower crust and mantle, such as: linear, non-linear, and yield stress fluids.

Materials used to simulate deformation of the middle crust

Composite Model Materials 

Composite materials combine phases with different physical properties. A common composite mixture contains dry granular materials and fluids. These analog materials have been used:

 Sediment transport (Parker et al., 1982) using low viscosity fluids
 Dynamics in the middle crust (Mookerjee et al., 2017; Reber et al., 2014) employing high viscosity fluids  
 Stick-slip dynamics (Higashi and Sumita, 2009; Reber et al., 2014)  
 Strain softening and hardening processes (Panien et al., 2006)

The most commonly used granular materials in composite mixtures are:

 Sand  
 Glass beads  
 Acrylic discs  
  

Common fluids used in composite mixtures are:  
 Carbopol  
 Silicone
 Wax, which can behave as a brittle or viscous material depending on the melting temperature (Mookerjee et al., 2017)

Visco-elasto-plastic model materials 
Visco-elasto-plastic deformation exhibits a combination of elastic, viscous, and plastic deformation at the same time. Various asphalts and bituminous materials demonstrate visco-elasto-plastic deformation but they are rarely as modeling materials (McBirney and Best, 1961).Common modeling materials demonstrating complex rheology are;

 Carbopol (Piau, 2007; Shafiei et al., 2018)
Kaolinite clay (Cooke and van der Elst, 2012)

References 

Structural geology
Earth sciences
Deformation (mechanics)